Line S 5 is a S-Bahn line in the Rhine-Ruhr network. It is operated by DB Regio. There are current plans to expand the line by building five new stations. It is operated between Dortmund and Witten at 30-minute intervals and between Witten and Hagen at 60-minute intervals using Alstom Coradia Continental type 1440.3 and class 422.

Line S 5 runs over  the Elberfeld–Dortmund railway opened by the Bergisch-Märkische Railway Company on 20 December 1848.

S-Bahn services commenced on the whole length of the route on 29 May 1994.

References

 
S05
1994 establishments in Germany